Michael Frendo (born 29 July 1955) is a former Maltese politician who currently is a lawyer and consultant. Previously he served in the government of Malta in various functions including as Minister of Foreign Affairs from 2004 to 2008 and Speaker of the House of Representatives of Malta from 2010 to 2013. He is from Floriana brother of Henry Frendo.

Political life
Frendo was first elected to the House of Representatives of Malta in 1987 and was re-elected in 1992, 1996, 1998 and 2003. From 1990 to 1992 he was Minister of State (Parliamentary Secretary) for Youth, Culture and Consumer Protection. From 1992 to 1994 he was Minister of Youth and Arts. From 1994 to 1996 he was Minister of Transport, Communications and Technology.

He was Parliamentary Secretary (Minister of State) in the Ministry of Foreign Affairs from March to July 2004 before becoming Minister of Foreign Affairs on 3 July 2004, replacing John Dalli. Frendo was not re-elected to the House of Representatives in the March 2008 parliamentary election and was consequently replaced as Foreign Minister on 12 March 2008. However, he regained a parliamentary seat in a casual election on 17 April 2008, after Cabinet had already been formed. After serving as Chairman of the Foreign and European Affairs Committee, in 2010, Michael Frendo was unanimously elected as Speaker of the House of Representatives, Malta's Parliament.

Frendo has been a member of the European Convention on the Future of Europe and a signatory to its Draft Constitutional Treaty, as well as a signatory to the Treaty establishing a Constitution for Europe and to the Treaty of Lisbon which superseded it and which is came into force on 1 December 2009. The only other person in Europe who is a signatory to all three documents leading to the new constitutional framework of the European Union is EU Commissioner and former Belgian Foreign Minister Karel De Gucht. In April 2010 he was nominated as Speaker of the House of Representatives, succeeding Louis Galea, who resigned office after being appointed as the Maltese representative in the European Court of Auditors. 

Michael Frendo is a member of the European Commission for Democracy through Law (Council of Europe's Venice Commission on constitutional matters) since June 2013.

Back in private practice as a lawyer and consultant, he is the Managing Director of Frendo Advisory, a firm specialising in offering immigration advise. He is also the (non-executive) Chairman of Banif Bank (Malta) Plc. Michael Frendo is a (part-time) Senior Lecturer at the Faculty of Laws of the University of Malta.

Michael Frendo has received honours from a number of countries including Spain, Portugal, Italy, Austria, Cyprus, Latvia and Tunisia. In December 2013, he was appointed Companion of the Order of Merit (K.O.M.) of the Republic of Malta.

Books
Frendo has published numerous books based on European Affairs: The Future of Europe (2003), Europe, The Case for Membership (1996), Malta in the Council of Europe (1990), Malta in the European Community - Commercial and Legal Considerations (1989), and Is Malta Burning? (1981). He also has written on a varied number of legal issues, in particular relating to Information and Communications technologies, Maritime affairs and the European Union.

References

External links
 Malta Ministry of Foreign Affairs
 Partit Nazzjonalista (in Maltese)
 (http://www.parlament.mt Parliament of Malta)

1955 births
Living people
Speakers of the House of Representatives of Malta
Alumni of the University of Exeter
Nationalist Party (Malta) politicians
Place of birth missing (living people)
Government ministers of Malta
Foreign ministers of Malta
20th-century Maltese politicians
21st-century Maltese politicians